Reise may refer to:

People
 Jay Reise (born 1950), American composer
 Leo Reise, Sr
 Leo Reise Jr.
 Reise Allassani (born 1996), English football player

Arts
 Die Reise or The Journey (1986 film), 1986 Swiss-German film
 Die Reise (album), 2018 Max Giesinger album
 Reise, Reise, 2004 Neue Deutsche album

Other
 Reise Know-How, German company group